Eugene F. Black (1903–1990) was a member of the Michigan Supreme Court from 1956 to 1972.

Black studied law at both the Detroit College of Law and the University of Michigan Law School.  He passed the bar in 1925.  In 1945, Black was elected Michigan Attorney General as a Republican, but he did not seek re-election two years later.  He later served as a judge of the Thirty-First Circuit.  In 1955, Black was elected to the Michigan Supreme Court as a Democrat.

Sources
bio of Black

1903 births
Detroit College of Law alumni
University of Michigan Law School alumni
1990 deaths
Justices of the Michigan Supreme Court
Michigan Republicans
20th-century American judges
20th-century American lawyers